Besatin (also Romanized as Besātīn and Basātīn; also known as Busālin) is a village in Nayband Rural District of Chah-e Mobarak District, Asaluyeh County, Bushehr province, Iran. At the 2006 census, its population was 638 in 108 households when it was in Asaluyeh District of Kangan County. The following census in 2011 counted 922 people in 120 households. The establishment of Chah-e Mobarak District, of which the village is now a part, was officially announced on 12 December 2012. The latest census in 2016 showed a population of 1,244 people in 250 households; it was the largest village in its rural district.

References 

Populated places in Asaluyeh County